Sonapur College, established in 1991, is a general degree college situated at Sonapur, in Kamrup district, Assam. This college is affiliated with the Gauhati University. This college offers different bachelor's degree courses in Arts, Commerce and B. Voc.

References

External links
http://www.sonapurcollege.ac.in/

Universities and colleges in Assam
Colleges affiliated to Gauhati University
Educational institutions established in 1991
1991 establishments in Assam